The South Clackamas Transportation District (SCTD) is a bus service that provides public transportation  in Molalla, Oregon, connecting that city to Clackamas Community College (and TriMet, which formerly provided the service) in Oregon City, and Canby (and Canby Area Transit).  The cost to ride to or from CCC  is only $1 USD; rides to or from Canby used to be free, but now also cost $1 USD.

The district was formed by the Clackamas County Board of Commissioners in 1989, originally as the Molalla Transportation District (and later renamed South Clackamas Transportation District), to replace TriMet service.  Molalla withdrew from the TriMet district on January 1, 1989. In the 2001 Fiscal Year (which started on July 1, 2000), the district's budget was approximately $700,000 ($ ). SCTD is funded by an employer payroll tax levied on employers within the district's boundaries.  As of 2000, the tax rate was three-tenths of a percent.  The current rate is five-tenths of one percent (0.5 percent).

Routes
Molalla to Clackamas Community College 
Intra-City Bus Route
Molalla to Canby

References

External links
SCTD official web site

1989 establishments in Oregon
Bus transportation in Oregon
Transit agencies in Oregon
Transportation in Clackamas County, Oregon
University and college bus systems